The 18th Letter is the debut solo album of American emcee Rakim, released November 4, 1997, on Universal Records in the United States. The album features production by DJ Clark Kent, Pete Rock, Father Shaheed, Nick Wiz and DJ Premier. It contains lyrical themes that concern hip hop's golden age, Rakim's rapping prowess, and the state of hip hop.

Background
It is his first release of new material, following a five-year hiatus after Don't Sweat the Technique (1992) as duo Eric B. & Rakim. The album's title refers to the letter "R" being the eighteenth letter of the English alphabet.

Deluxe version
A deluxe version of The 18th Letter was sold with the compilation disc The Book of Life (UD2-53111), an Eric B. & Rakim greatest hits collection. The Book of Life was also issued separately as a double vinyl LP.

Commercial performance
The 18th Letter debuted at number four on the U.S. Billboard 200 chart and was certified Gold in the United States.

Track listing

Notes
 signifies a co-producer.
"The Mystery (Who Is God?)" contains scratches by DJ Sond

The Book of Life

Charts

Weekly charts

Year-end charts

Certifications

The 18th Letter & The Book of Life

See also
List of number-one R&B albums of 1997 (U.S.)

References

External links 
 The 18th Letter at Discogs
 
 The Microphone God — By Vibe

Rakim albums
1997 debut albums
Albums produced by DJ Premier
Albums produced by Pete Rock
Albums produced by Eric B.
Universal Records albums
Hip hop albums by American artists